The 2010 Volkswagen Jetta TDI Cup season was the third & final season of the Volkswagen Jetta TDI Cup. It consisted of seven race meetings with ten total races. JD Mobley won the championship by 21 points over Juan Pablo Sierra Lendle with two poles and two wins.

Driver lineup

Season results

References

External links
 Official Website
 SCCA Series Website

Volkswagen Jetta TDI Cup
Volkswagen Jetta Tdi Cup